The 1946 New South Wales Grand Prix was a motor race staged at the Mount Panorama Circuit near Bathurst in New South Wales, Australia on 7 October 1946. It was contested as a handicap event with the first of the 22 cars starting 22 minutes and 2 seconds before the last two starters.

The race was won by Alf Najar driving an MG TB Monoposto.

Results

Notes
 Attendance: 27,000 (estimated) 
 Race distance: 25 laps, 96.5  miles (155.4 km)
 Number of entries: 32
 Number of starters: 22
 Number of classified finishers: 7
 Whatmore finished outside race time limit
 Emerson was flagged off the course as the time limit had expired
 First driver to start: Bill Conoulty
 Last drivers to start: Frank Kleinig and John Crouch
 Fastest race time: Jack Murray (Bugatti Ford s/c), 1h 26m 24s
 Fastest lap: Frank Kleinig (Hudson Eight Special), 3m 20s

References

External links
 Bathurst 1946 New South Wales Grand Prix, Video of 1946 New South Wales Grand Prix, believed also to include 1947 footage, www.theroaringseason.com
 1946 New South Wales Grand Prix, primotipo.com
 Grand Prix Bathurst, October 1946, archival.sl.nsw.gov.au

1946 in Australian motorsport
Motorsport in Bathurst, New South Wales
New South Wales Grand Prix
October 1946 sports events in Australia